Sit Resist is the second album by Laura Stevenson & The Cans. The album was released by Don Giovanni Records in 2011.

Track listing

References

Laura Stevenson albums
2011 albums
Don Giovanni Records albums